Pediasia georgella is a moth in the family Crambidae. It was described by Kosakjewitsch in 1978. It is found in Russia, where it has been recorded from southern Transbaikal.

References

Crambini
Moths described in 1978
Moths of Asia